The 2014 Louisiana–Lafayette Ragin' Cajuns football program represented the University of Louisiana at Lafayette in the 2014 NCAA Division I FBS football season.  The team was led by fourth-year head coach Mark Hudspeth.  The Ragin' Cajuns played their home games at Cajun Field and competed in the Sun Belt Conference. They finished the season 9–4 overall and 7–1 in Sun Belt play to finish in second place. They were invited to the New Orleans Bowl, for the fourth consecutive year, where they defeated Nevada. However, in 2015 Louisiana–Lafayette vacated two wins due to major NCAA violations.

Previous season
Louisiana-Lafayette went 9–4 overall and 5–2 in Sun Belt play. They shared the Sun Belt Conference Championship with Arkansas State. They also defeated Tulane 24–21 in the 2013 New Orleans Bowl for the program's third consecutive New Orleans Bowl win. However, in 2015 Louisiana–Lafayette vacated eight wins including the 2013 New Orleans Bowl and the 2013 Sun Belt Conference Co-Championship due to major NCAA violations.

Preseason

Award watch lists
The following players were named to preseason award watch lists:

Davey O'Brien Award:
 Terrance Broadway

Lombardi Award:
 Mykhael Quave
 Daniel Quave
 Justin Hamilton
 Dominique Tovell

Biletnikoff Award:
 Jamal Robinson

Preseason All Conference Team

First Team Offense:
QB Terrance Broadway
RB Alonzo Harris
RB Elijah McGuire
WR Jamal Robinson
OL Daniel Quave

First Team Defense:
DL Justin Hamilton
DL Dominique Tovell
S Trevence Patt

Second Team Offense:
OL Mykhael Quave

Second Team Defense:
DL Christian Ringo

Offensive Player of the Year:
QB Terrance Broadway

Roster

Schedule

Source:

Game summaries

Southern

Louisiana Tech

Ole Miss

Boise State

Georgia State

Texas State

Arkansas State

South Alabama

New Mexico State

Louisiana-Monroe

Appalachian State

Troy

Nevada (New Orleans Bowl)

References

Louisiana-Lafayette
Louisiana Ragin' Cajuns football seasons
New Orleans Bowl champion seasons
Louisiana-Lafayette Ragin' Cajuns football